Ars Fennica Award presented by the Henna and Pertti Niemistö Ars Fennica Art Foundation is the biggest Finnish art award that has been awarded since 1991. The Ars Fennica art award is made annually to one artist in recognition of distinctive artistic output of high merit. The award is 40,000 euros.

Winners

See also 

List of European art awards

References

External links 
 

Visual arts awards
Finnish awards
Awards established in 1991
1991 establishments in Finland